Caleijão is a settlement in the central part of the island of São Nicolau, Cape Verde. It is situated 2 km southwest of Ribeira Brava. Writer Baltasar Lopes da Silva was born in the village. Part of his novel Chiquinho is set in Caleijão.

See also
List of villages and settlements in Cape Verde

References

Villages and settlements in São Nicolau, Cape Verde
Ribeira Brava, Cape Verde